Fabio Lagonissa (1584/85–1659) was an Italian bishop and papal diplomat.

Life
Lagonissa was born in Naples in 1584, or possibly 1585, a son of Giovanni Battista Lagonissa and Feliciana Caracciolo. After studying civil and canon law at the University of Naples he went to Rome and was appointed a referendary of the Apostolic Signatura. From 1614 to 1619 he was inquisitor of Malta and consultor to the Holy Office. On 21 February 1622 he was consecrated archbishop of Conza, but remained active in the papal curia. He accompanied Francesco Barberini on his unsuccessful mission to Spain in 1625–26.

In March 1627 he was appointed papal nuncio to the Southern Netherlands. After the Infanta Isabella's death in 1633 the nunciature fell into abeyance, and in January 1634 Lagonissa returned to Rome.

In 1645 he resigned as archbishop of Conza. He died in Naples in February 1659.

References

1580s births
1659 deaths
Apostolic Nuncios to Flanders
17th-century Roman Catholic archbishops in the Kingdom of Naples
16th-century Neapolitan people
Inquisitors of Malta
Archbishops of Sant'Angelo dei Lombardi-Conza-Nusco-Bisaccia